The San Francisco Contemporary Music Players (SFCMP) is a performing arts organization and unionized chamber orchestra that commissions, performs, and records innovative new music from across cultures and stylistic traditions. SFCMP incorporated in 1974 to give voice to the burgeoning genre of contemporary chamber music in the Bay Area. They are solely devoted to contemporary repertoire, particularly the work of living composers and large ensemble works. The current Artistic Director is Eric Dudley.

The Contemporary Music Players are a 2018 awardee of the esteemed Fromm Foundation Ensemble Prize and a ten-time winner of the national ASCAP/Chamber Music America Award for Adventurous Programming of Contemporary Music. The San Francisco Contemporary Music Players have performed more than 1,300 contemporary works, including many U.S. and world premieres, and has commissioned new pieces from such composers as John Adams, John Cage, Fred Frith, Liza Lim, James Newton, and Julia Wolfe. 

View repertoire list at https://sfcmp.org/sfcmp-repertory-list/

Artistic collaborations
In 1983, Frank Zappa led the ensemble in performing music by Edgard Varèse.  The concert, which was emceed by Jefferson Airplane vocalist Grace Slick and held in the San Francisco Opera House, attracted an audience of more than 2,000 people. In 1997, electric guitarist Bill Frisell and drummer Joey Baron appeared as soloists with the ensemble, performing Steven Mackey’s concerto, Deal.  Later the same year, vocalist Dawn Upshaw appeared with the ensemble in a performance of George Crumb’s Ancient Voices of Children.

Musicians / executive directors / artistic directors and conductors / board presidents and founders 

Musicians

Current ensemble members

 Tod Brody, flute
 Kyle Bruckmann, oboe
 Sarah Rathke,oboe
 Jeff Anderle, clarinet
 Peter Josheff, clarinet
 Adam Luftman, trumpet
 Brendan Lai-Tong, trombone
 Peter Wahrhaftig, tuba
 William Winant, percussion
 Christopher Froh, percussion
 Loren Mach, percussion
 Haruka Fujii, percussion
 Meredith Clark, harp
 Kate Campbell, piano
 David Tanenbaum, guitar
 Roy Malan, violin
 Susan Freier, violin
 Hrabba Atladottir, violin
 Nanci Severance, viola
 Meena Bhasin, viola
 Stephen Harrison, cello
 Hannah Addario-Berry, cello
 Richard Worn, contrabass
Past ensemble members

 List pending

Executive Directors

 Marcella DeCray (1974-1988)
 Susan Munn (1988-1991)
 Adam Frey (1991-2009)
 Christopher Honett (2009-2010)
 Carrie Blanding (2010-2012)
 Rozella Kennedy (2012-2015)
 Lisa Oman (2015-2021)
 Richard Aldag (2021-present)

Artistic Directors and Principal Conductors
Jean-Louis LeRoux (1974–1988)
Stephen L. (Lucky) Mosko (1988–1997)
Donald Palma (1998–2000)
David Milnes (2002–2009)
Steven Schick (2011–2018)
Eric Dudley (2018–present)

Board Presidents

 Jean-Louis LeRoux (1974-1978)
 Jane Roos (1978-1986)
 Paul R. Griffin (1986-1996)
 T. William Melis (1996-2000)
 Roy C. (Bud) Johns (2000-2001)
 Anne Baldwin (2002-2005) 
 Susan Hartzell (2005-2009) 
 Richard D. Lee (2009-2013) 
 Donald Blais (2010-2021)
 Kit Sharma (2021-present)

Founders

SFCMP evolved from concerts begun in 1971 by Charles Boone and was incorporated as a nonprofit in 1974 by Marcella DeCray and Jean-Louis LeRoux. The San Francisco Contemporary Music Players is a unionized ensemble based out of San Francisco, California.

Recent discography
links to recordings https://sfcmp.org/sfcmp-recordings/
1991: Morton Feldman, For Samuel Beckett, (CD) Newport Classics
1992: Wayne Peterson, Sextet, (CD) New World Records
1993: Lou Harrison, The Perilous Chapel, New Albion Records
1993: John Cage, Music for... (CD) Newport Classic
1993: Morton Feldman, For Samuel Beckett (CD) Newport Classic
1993: Steven Mackey, Indigenous Instruments (CD) Newport Classic
1995: James Newton, As the Sound of Many Waters, (CD) New World Records
1996: Olly Wilson, No More (not released)
1996: John Thow, Songs for the Earth (CD) Music and Arts Programs of America, Inc.
1998: Earle Brown, Centering (CD) Newport Classic
1999: Hyo-shin Na, Music for Piano and Strings (Transcription) (CD) Seoul Records Inc
2000: James Newton, As the Sound of Many Waters (CD) New World Records
2002: Andrew Imbrie, Spring Fever: Chicago Bells, Songs of Then and Now (CD) Albany Records
2005: Jorge Liderman, The Song of Songs (CD) Bridge Records
2006: Pablo Ortiz, Oscuro (CD) Albany Records
2007: Kui Dong, Pangu’s Song (CD) New World Records
2008: Edmund Campion, Outside Music: Music of Edmund Campion, (CD) Albany Records

References

External links
Official site
Art of the States : San Francisco Contemporary Music Players
[http://www.ericdudley.net/ 

Musical groups from San Francisco
Orchestras based in California